Chithramela is a 1967 Malayalam-language anthology film directed and produced by T. S. Muthaiah. It was Malayalam cinema's first anthology film, consisting of three short films. The cast includes Prem Nazir, Sharada, Sheela, K. P. Ummer, Kottayam Chellappan, S. P. Pillai, Adoor Bhasi, Bahadoor and Manavalan Joseph.

List of short films

Plots

First segment (Nagarathinte Mukhangal)
The short film showed the tragic fate of children left alone at home while the parents enjoyed themselves at late-night parties and meetings. One such couple, Sheela and K. P. Ummer, leave their daughter at home with the servant and go for a party. The naughty girl plays with the telephone, dials numbers and interacts with the person at the other end of the line. One such call results in trouble. The call was to a house which happened to be the venue of a murder. The girl says over the phone that she knew what was happening there. The murderer (Kottayam Chellappan) locates the number, kidnaps the girl and attempts to kill her. But the intervention of the police saves the girl's life.

Second segment (Penninte Prapancham)
The characters in the film were the original film stars themselves. Adoor Bhasi, Manavalan Joseph and Bahadoor are trained to drive a car by S. P. Pillai, their ashan or teacher. They encounter hilarious situations with the women they meet. All the students and their teacher go into a deep sleep. They wake up after 50 years to find that men have lost dominance; women, they find, have become all-powerful in the world.

Third segment (Apaswarangal)
The film told the story of a tragic love affair between a blind girl and a street singer. Seetha (Sharada), the daughter of a coolie in a colony is in love with Babu (Prem Nazir), a street singer. A city wastrel's evil eye falls on Seetha and Babu is beaten up severely by his goons. A famous dancer happens to listen to Babu's singing. Babu goes on to accept the patronage of the dancer, separating him from Seetha. The colony is hit by an outbreak of smallpox. Except for Seetha and a small boy, all the others die. Seetha and the boy leave in search of Babu. She hears Babu's voice from a theatre. Babu rushes to meet his lover. Seetha, who is elated falls into his arms and dies.

Cast

Prem Nazir
Sheela
Sharada
Sukumari
Adoor Bhasi
Thikkurissy Sukumaran Nair
Manavalan Joseph
T. R. Omana
Baby
Prathapachandran
Abhayam
Baby Rajani
Bahadoor
C. R. Lakshmi
Devi Chandrika
G. K. Pillai
J. A. R. Anand
K. P. Ummer
Kaduvakulam Antony
Kashmiri
Khadeeja
Kottayam Chellappan
Kuttan Pillai
Master Sridhar
Meena
Nellikode Bhaskaran
Rajeshwari
S. P. Pillai
Usha
Wahab

Production
Veteran actor T. S. Muthiah made his directorial debut with Chithramela. He also produced the film under the banner of Sree Movies. Director M. Krishnan Nair is credited for giving technical assistance in direction. The idea for the short film Penninte Prapancham was by film producer T. E. Vasudevan. He, in turn, was inspired by a Laurel and Hardy film.

Chithramela was the first anthology film (portmanteau film) in Malayalam. The Tamil film Sirikkathe (1939) was the first anthology film in India. The Malayalam film industry has produced only a handful of anthology films to date, which include Yauvanam/Vandikkari (1974), Naalu Pennungal (2007), Kerala Cafe (2009) and Oru Yathrayil (2013), among others. However, since the advent of new-wave Malayalam cinema of the 2010s, many films which used hyperlink format for storytelling came out. Some film pundits consider these films also as portmanteau films.

Soundtrack
The film's music was provided by G. Devarajan, assisted by R. K. Shekhar. There are eight songs in the film, all of them included in the third and longest segment Apaswarangal. The lyrics were penned by Sreekumaran Thampi, who also penned the script for Apaswarangal. All the songs became super hits. Seven solos by K. J. Yesudas and a duet with S. Janaki, are considered gems in Malayalam film music.

References

External links
 
 Chithramela at the Malayalam Movie Database

1960s Malayalam-language films
Indian anthology films
1960s crime thriller films
1967 romantic comedy films
1960s musical films
1967 directorial debut films
Indian comedy films
1967 comedy films
1967 films